In a corner on the Macintyre (Thunderbolt in an encounter with police at Paradise Creek) is a 1895 painting by the Australian artist Tom Roberts.   The painting is thought to depict the bushranger Captain Thunderbolt in a shootout with police.

Roberts painted the picture while staying at Newstead, a station near Inverell, New South Wales, where he also painted his other significant bushranging work Bailed up.

The painting was acquired by the National Gallery of Australia in 1971.

References

External links
 – National Gallery of Australia

Paintings by Tom Roberts
1895 paintings
Collections of the National Gallery of Australia
Bushrangers
Horses in art
Landscape paintings